Íngrid Xiomara Medrano Cuéllar (born July 6, 1979 in San Salvador) is a female freestyle wrestler from El Salvador. She participated in Women's freestyle 48 kg at 2008 Summer Olympics. In the eighth final she beat Erica Dobre from Romania. In the quarter final Medrano lost with Kazakh Tatyana Bakatyuk. She won a silver medal at the 2007 Pan American Games.

External links
 Athlete bio and results on beijing2008.com
 sports-reference

Living people
1979 births
Wrestlers at the 2007 Pan American Games
Wrestlers at the 2008 Summer Olympics
Wrestlers at the 2011 Pan American Games
Olympic wrestlers of El Salvador
Salvadoran female sport wrestlers
Sportspeople from San Salvador
Pan American Games silver medalists for El Salvador
Pan American Games medalists in wrestling
Medalists at the 2007 Pan American Games